Melangyna arctica is a Holarctic species of hoverfly.

Description
External images
For terms see Morphology of Diptera 
The wing length is 5·75-7·5 mm. Tergites 3 and 4 with white to yellow marks. Wing membrane entirely covered in microtrichia. Scutellar hairs no longer than the scutellum. The male terminalia are figured by Hippa (1968). The larva is figured in colour by Rotheray (1994).

See references for determination'

Distribution
Palearctic Fennoscandia, Britain and Ireland, Schwarzwald (Germany), the Czech Republic, France (Pyrenees and Alps), Switzerland, Liechtenstein. North and Central Siberia to Kamchatka.Nearctic Alaska and Canada, Rocky mountains to as far as Colorado.

Biology
Habitat: Abies, Picea, Pinus forest and deciduous woodland (Alnus, Betula Salix). Arboreal, but descends to visit flowers of Acer pseudoplatanus, Galium, Ilex, Prunus spinosa, Ranunculus, Salix, Stellaria, Taraxacum. 
 The flight period is April to June ( later at higher altitudes). The larva is associated with aphid-infested trees.

References

Diptera of Europe
Syrphinae
Syrphini
Insects described in 1838